Windhill and Wrose (population 14,541 - 2001 UK census) is a ward within the City of Bradford Metropolitan District Council in the county of West Yorkshire, England, named after the districts of Windhill and Wrose around which it is drawn.

The population as of the 2011 census had increased to 16,408.
As well as Windhill and Wrose, the ward includes the districts of Owlet, Bolton Woods, West Royd and Wood End.

Councillors 
Windhill and Wrose ward is represented on Bradford Council by three Labour councillors, Vanda Greenwood, Susan Hinchcliffe and Alex Ross-Shaw.

 indicates seat up for re-election.

See also
Listed buildings in Windhill and Wrose

References

Further reading 

 Joseph Wright (1893) A Grammar of the Dialect of Windhill.

External links 
 
 Archive of Bradford Council Election Results 2002-Present
 Council ward profile(pdf) 
 .

Wards of Bradford